Reuben Benjamin Johannes (born 5 October 1990) is a South African professional rugby union player who last played for the  in the Currie Cup and in the Rugby Challenge. His regular position is flanker.

Career
Following the Under-18 Craven Week in 2008, he was also included in the South Africa Under-18 Elite Squad.

He played further games for the Under-19 and Under-21 teams and was included in Western Province's squad for the 2011 Vodacom Cup. He made his first class debut in the 56–9 victory over Namibian side . He made one additional appearance that season.

In 2012, he was once again included in the Vodacom Cup squad and made a further four appearances, scoring two tries. He was included in the squad for the 2012 Currie Cup Premier Division, but failed to make any matchday squads.

At the end of 2012, South Africa Sevens manager Paul Treu called him into the squad for the 2012 Gold Coast Sevens leg of the 2012–13 IRB Sevens World Series.

He also represented  in the 2011 and 2013 Varsity Cup competitions.

Pumas

References

1990 births
Living people
Competitors at the 2013 World Games
Rugby union flankers
Rugby union players from Bellville, South Africa
South Africa international rugby sevens players
South African rugby union players
Western Province (rugby union) players
World Games gold medalists